Lawrence Lake may refer to:

Lawrence Lake, in the Houston County, Minnesota, USA
Lawrence Lake (Saskatchewan), in the southwestern part of the province in or near the municipality Arlington No. 79